Arabic Presentation Forms-B is a Unicode block encoding spacing forms of Arabic diacritics, and contextual letter forms. The special codepoint ZWNBSP (zero width no-break space) is also here, which is only meant for a byte order mark (that may precede text, Arabic or not, or be absent). The block name in Unicode 1.0 was Basic Glyphs for Arabic Language; its characters were re-ordered in the process of merging with ISO 10646 in Unicode 1.0.1 and 1.1.

The presentation forms are present only for compatibility with older standards, and are not currently needed for coding text.

Block

History
The following Unicode-related documents record the purpose and process of defining specific characters in the Arabic Presentation Forms-B block:

References

Notes

Unicode blocks